The Ambassador Extraordinary and Plenipotentiary of the Russian Federation to the Syrian Arab Republic is the official representative of the President and the Government of the Russian Federation to the President and the Government of Syria.

The ambassador and his staff work at large in the Embassy of Russia in Damascus.

History of diplomatic relations

Diplomatic relations between the Soviet Union and Syria were first established in July 1944 with the exchange of diplomatic missions. Daniel Solod was the first envoy, assigned to the post on 14 September 1944, and presenting his letter of credence on 26 October 1944.  On 22 November 1955 relations were further strengthened with the establishment of embassies, with the representative's status raised from envoy to ambassador. In February 1958 the United Arab Republic was formed between Egypt and Syria. The new state had its capital in Cairo and representation was provided by the Soviet ambassador to Egypt. On 27 February 1958 the embassy in Damascus became a consulate general of the USSR. The new state was short-lived. Syria seceded in 1961, and diplomatic relations were restored at the embassy level, Consul General  continuing as the new ambassador. With the dissolution of the Soviet Union in 1991 the last Soviet ambassador, continued in post as the representative of the Russian Federation.

List of representatives (1944 – present)

Representatives of the Soviet Union to Syria (1944 – 1958)

Consuls-General of the Soviet Union in Damascus (1958 – 1961)

Representatives of the Soviet Union to Syria (1961 – 1991)

Representatives of the Russian Federation to Syria (1991 – present)

References

External links

 
 
Syria
Russia